Wanshun Town is an urban town in Changshou District, Chongqing, People's Republic of China.

Administrative division
The town is divided into 8 villages, the following areas: Wanshun Village, Sichong Village, Baihe Village, Yuanzi Village, Wanhua Village, Dongfeng Village, Shilong Village, and Yakou Village (万顺村、四重村、白合村、院子村、万花村、东风村、石龙村、垭口村).

References 

Divisions of Changshou District
Towns in Chongqing